"Vegas Two Times" is a song by Welsh rock band Stereophonics from their third studio album, Just Enough Education to Perform (2001). Written by lead vocalist and guitarist Kelly Jones, the song was released as the fifth and final single from the album on 1 April 2002, reaching number 23 on the UK Singles Chart and number 39 on the Irish Singles Chart.

Track listings
All songs were written and composed by Kelly Jones; "Local Boy in the Photograph" was co-composed by Richard Jones and Stuart Cable.

CD single
 "Vegas Two Times"
 "Mr. Writer" (live)
 "Watch Them Fly Sundays" (live)

DVD single
 "Vegas Two Times" (video)
 "Vegas Two Times" (radio edit audio)
 "Vegas Two Times" (live audio)
 "Roll Up and Shine" (live audio)
 "Mr. Writer" (live video sample)
 "Watch Them Fly Sundays" (live video sample)
 "Step on My Old Size Nines" (live video sample)
 "Local Boy in the Photograph" (live video sample)

Personnel
Stereophonics
 Kelly Jones – vocals, guitars
 Richard Jones – bass
 Stuart Cable – drums

Session musicians
 Marshall Bird – piano, backing vocals
 Aileen McLaughlin – backing vocals
 Anna Ross – backing vocals
 Hazel Fernandez – backing vocals

Production personnel
 Steve Bush – production
 Andy Wallace – mixing

Charts

References

2001 songs
2002 singles
Songs about Las Vegas
Songs written by Kelly Jones
Stereophonics songs
V2 Records singles